Partulina variabilis (Lanai tree snail) is a species of tropical air-breathing land snail, a terrestrial pulmonate gastropod mollusk in the family Achatinellidae. This species is endemic to Hawaii. The US Fish and Wildlife Service recently proposed to list this snail as an endangered species.

References

External links 

Molluscs of Hawaii
Partulina
Gastropods described in 1853
Taxonomy articles created by Polbot
ESA endangered species